"Midnight" is the first single taken from the album Street Child by Mexican alternative rock singer Elan. It was released in Mexico on June 13, 2003. Elan fans brought 3 national servers down in Mexico with email requests for this song. This single reached #1 in airplay in most Mexican territories and stayed on top for ten weeks without changing its position. The single also reached #28 in Australia. There are 2 edits of the music video, one with black and white handycam footage interpoled of her, and the other one without those scenes added.

Track listing
 Midnight (4:32)
 Midnight (acoustic re-mix) (4:21)

Charts

References

2003 singles
Elán (musician) songs
2003 songs
Song articles with missing songwriters